The fourth season of the American comedy television series Silicon Valley premiered in the United States on HBO on April 23, 2017. The season contained 10 episodes, and concluded on June 25, 2017. This is the final season to feature T.J. Miller as Erlich Bachman.

Cast

Main 
 Thomas Middleditch as Richard Hendricks
 T.J. Miller as Erlich Bachman
 Josh Brener as Nelson "Big Head" Bighetti
 Martin Starr as Bertram Gilfoyle
 Kumail Nanjiani as Dinesh Chugtai
 Amanda Crew as Monica Hall
 Zach Woods as Donald "Jared" Dunn
 Matt Ross as Gavin Belson
 Suzanne Cryer as Laurie Bream
 Jimmy O. Yang as Jian-Yang
 Stephen Tobolowsky as Jack Barker
 Chris Diamantopoulos as Russ Hanneman

Recurring

Episodes

Production 
In April 2016, the series was renewed for a fourth season.

The fourth season promotional poster was designed by visual artist and graphic novelist Daniel Clowes, who was commissioned by HBO to produce a poster in his iconic style.

Reception

Critical response 
On review aggregator Rotten Tomatoes, the season holds a 97% approval rating, earning a "Certified Fresh" rating. It holds an average score of 8.18/10 based on 33 reviews. The site's critical consensus reads "Silicon Valleys fourth season advances the veteran comedy's overall arc while adding enough new wrinkles – and delivering more than enough laughs – to stay fresh." Similarly, on Metacritic, which uses a weighted average, holds a score of 85 out of 100, based on reviews from 10 critics, indicating "universal acclaim".

Giving the season a B+ grade, Ben Travers of IndieWire praised the show's "renewed focus on the dangers of ambition", and writes that the fourth season "becomes a bit more thoughtful and bit more ambitious". In Vulture, Odie Henderson called the season the show's funniest yet.

Most of the season's criticisms noticed the show's repetitiveness, but often found the series funny nonetheless. Verne Gay of Newsday wrote, "There's a sense that we've traveled down this road paved with silicon once or twice before, but the ride is still smart, engaging, and highly informative." Still, when reviewing the season finale, Alex Riviello of Slash Film expressed disappointment that "the season squandered any forward momentum it promised with the premiere" Similarly, The Washington Posts Alyssa Rosenberg wrote that "The biggest problem with [the season finale episode] is obviously that it repeats the series' pattern of ending seasons".

Home media 
The fourth season was released on DVD and Blu-ray on September 12, 2017; bonus features include deleted scenes.

References

External links 
 
 

2017 American television seasons
Silicon Valley (TV series)